Reflective writing is an analytical practice in which the writer describes a real or imaginary scene, event, interaction, passing thought, or memory and adds a personal reflection on its meaning. Many reflective writers keep in mind questions such as "What did I notice?", "How has this changed me?" or "What might I have done differently?" when reflecting.

Thus, in reflective writing, the focus is on writing that is not merely descriptive. The writer revisits the scene to note details and emotions, reflect on meaning, examine what went well or revealed a need for additional learning, and relate what transpired to the rest of life.

According to Kara Taczak, "Reflection is a mode of inquiry: a deliberate way of systematically recalling writing experiences to reframe the current writing situation."

The more someone reflectively writes, the more likely they are to regularly reflect in their everyday life, think outside the box, and challenge accepted practices.

Background 
When writing reflectively, a writer attempts to convey their own thought process. Therefore, reflective writing is one of the more personal styles of writing as the writer is clearly inserted into the work. This style of writing invites both the reader and the writer to introspect and examine their own thoughts and beliefs, and gives the writer and the reader a closer, less distant relationship.

Reflective writing tends to consist of description, or explaining the event and its context; interpretation, or how the experience challenged existing opinions; and outcome, or how the experience contributed to personal or professional development.

Most reflective writing is written in first person, as it speaks to the writer's personal experience, but often it is supplemented with third person in academic works as the writer must support their perspective with outside evidence.

Reflective writing is usually a style that must be learned and practiced. Most novice writers are not reflective initially, and must progress from imitative writing to their own style of genuine, critical reflection.

Kathleen Blake Yancey notes that reflection "is the dialectical process by which we develop and achieve, first, specific goals for learning; second, strategies for reaching those goals; and third, means of determining whether or not we have met those goals or other goals."

The concepts of reflection and reflective writing are social constructs prevalent in academic literature, and in different contexts their meanings have different interpretations.

Characteristics of reflective writing 
The main characteristics of reflective writing include:

Reflection: The writer reflects on the issue (that is, the topic they are writing about) and considers how their own experience and points of view might influence their response. This helps the writer learn about themselves as well as contribute to a better final product that considers biases.
Evidence: The writer considers and cites different perspectives and evidence to provide a truly comprehensive reflection. "Evidence" can mean either academic evidence or the writer's own reflections and experiences, depending on whether the piece of reflection is personal or academic.
Clarity: The writer must be clear and cohesive. As reflective writing takes the reader through both the writer's own thoughts and sometimes other outside perspectives, unity and readability are crucial to ensure the reader does not get lost between points of view.

If the reflection is written for academia—that is, it is not a personal reflection or journal—additional features include:

Theory: An academic reflection will integrate theories and other academic works to explain the reflection. For example, a writer might say: "Smith's theory of social engagement might explain why I reacted the way I did."
Learning outcomes: An academic reflection will include commentary on how the writer learned from the experience, what they would have done differently, or how their perspectives or opinions have changed as a result of the experience.

Reflective writing in academia

Reflective writing is regularly used in academic settings, as it helps students think about how they think. In other words, it is a form of metacognition. It is frequently assigned to postsecondary students, and is particularly useful to students and practitioners in composition, education and health-related fields as it helps them reflect on their practice. Typical academic reflective writings include portfolios, summaries, and journals. Reflective writing is not limited in academic writing because it often takes many different forms. Sometimes it is used in stand-alone assessment tasks, and other times it is incorporated into other tasks such as essays.

Evidence shows that reflective writing is a good way to increase empathy in medical students. Another study showed that students who were assigned reflective writing during a camp developed greater self-awareness, had a better understanding of their goals, and were better able to recognize their personal development.

Reflective writing is useful to improve collaboration, as it makes writers aware of how they sound when they voice their thoughts and opinions to others. Additionally, it is an important part of the reflective learning cycle, which includes planning, acting, observing, and reflecting.

Students can be hesitant to write reflectively as it requires them to not just consider but actively cite things they typically would hide or ignore in academic writing, like their anxieties and shortcomings.

Reflective writing in academic settings is sometimes criticized, as concerns exist regarding its effectiveness. Reflective writing assignments are often weighted low in a course's grade calculations, and among a crowded workload, students can see them as an afterthought. It has also been argued that reflective writing assignments are only assigned as "busy work", as they are low maintenance and relatively easy to grade. Additionally, because students know they will be graded on their reflection, it might be written in an inauthentic way.

Nonetheless, reflective writing is becoming increasingly important in education, as reflecting on completed work helps students see room for improvement.

References

Writing
Medical humanities